Valentin Nikolaevich Voloshinov (June 18, 1895, St. Petersburg – June 13, 1936, Leningrad) was a Russian Soviet linguist, whose work has been influential in the field of literary theory and Marxist theory of ideology.

Marxism and the Philosophy of Language 

Written in the late 1920s in the USSR, Voloshinov's Marxism and the Philosophy of Language (tr.: Marksizm i Filosofiya Yazyka) attempts to incorporate the field of linguistics into Marxism. The book's main inspiration does not come from previous Marxists, whom Voloshinov saw as largely indifferent towards the study of language. Voloshinov's theories are instead built on critical engagement with Wilhelm von Humboldt's concept of language as a continuous creative or "generative" process, and with the view of language as a sign-system posited by Ferdinand de Saussure. To some extent, Voloshinov's linguistic thought is also mediated by the analyses of his Soviet contemporary Nicholas Marr.

For Voloshinov, language is the medium of ideology, and cannot be separated from ideology. Ideology, however, is not to be understood in the classical Marxist sense as an illusory mental phenomenon that arises as a reflex of a "real" material economic substructure. Language, as a socially constructed sign-system, is what allows consciousness to arise, and is in itself a material reality. Because of this belief that language and human consciousness are closely related, Voloshinov holds that the study of verbal interaction is key to understanding social psychology.  Voloshinov further argues for understanding psychological mechanisms within a framework of ideological function in his book Freudianism: A Marxist critique.

Voloshinov argues that it is a mistake to study language abstractly and synchronically (i.e. in an unhistorical manner), as Saussure does.  For Voloshinov, words are dynamic social signs, which take different meanings for different social classes in different historical contexts. The meaning of words is not subject to passive understanding, but includes the active participation of both the speaker (or writer) and hearer (or reader). While every word is a sign taken from an inventory of available signs, the manipulation of the word contained in each speech act or individual utterance is regulated by social relations. In Voloshinov's view, the meaning of verbal signs is the arena of continuous class struggle: a ruling class will try to narrow the meaning of social signs, making them "uni-accentual", but the clash of various class-interests in times of social unrest will make clear the "multi-accentuality" of words.

By virtue of his belief that the "struggle for meaning" coincides with class struggle, Voloshinov's theories have much in common with those of Italian Communist Antonio Gramsci, who shared an interest in linguistics. Voloshinov's work can also be seen to prefigure many of the concerns of poststructuralism.

Voloshinov devotes the last portion of  Marxism and the Philosophy of Language to a treatment of reported speech in order to show social and temporal relations between utterances to be integral properties of language. This was taken up by Roman Jakobson in an essay entitled: "Shifters and Verbal Categories," and influenced the development of the Prague School of functional linguistics as well as linguistic anthropology.

Through an entirely parallel evolution, Voloshinov's model of dialogism, of meaning being functionally contextual and of cognition/consciousness emerging from verbal behaviour, prefigured the empirically derived poststructuralist model of language and cognition Relational Frame Theory which emerged in the 1990s, and upon which CBT and ACT therapies are based.

Some scholars believe that works bearing Voloshinov's name were actually authored by his colleague Mikhail Bakhtin, although the topic is still the subject of debate; a few of these works have been added to reprinted editions of Bakhtin's collected works.

See also
Charles Sanders Peirce
György Lukács
Lev Vygotsky
Otto Jespersen
Pavel Nikolaevich Medvedev
Russian formalism

References

Further reading
Jakobson, R. "Shifters and Verbal Categories." On Language. (ed. Linda R. Waugh and Monique Monville-Burston). 1990. 386–392.

External links
Voloshinov archive at Marxists.org
Review of Marxism and the Philosophy of Language at Green Left Weekly
Discussion of Voloshinov from Issue 75 of "International Socialism"
The Bakhtin Circle
Marksizm i filosofija jazyka: secondary bibliography, overview, influence on & of, new terminology (in French) (Notice: Corpus des textes linguistiques fondamentaux)

1895 births
1936 deaths
Academics from Saint Petersburg
People from Sankt-Peterburgsky Uyezd
Linguists from Russia
Russian philologists
Marxist theorists
Linguists from the Soviet Union
20th-century linguists
20th-century philologists